List of South Carolina wildlife management areas.

 Aiken Gopher Tortoise Heritage Preserve/Wildlife Management Area
 Angelus WMA
 Ashmore Heritage Preserve/Wildlife Management Area
 Bear Island Wildlife Management Area
 Belfast Wildlife Management Area
 Bland Tract Dove Field, Manchester State Forest (MSF) WMA
 Bonneau Ferry Wildlife Management Area
 Botany Bay Plantation Heritage Preserve/ Wildlife Management Area
 Brasstown Creek Heritage Preserve/Wildlife Management Area
 Buzzard Roost Heritage Preserve/Wildlife Management Area
 Caesars Head/Jones Gap
 Campbells Crossroads WMA
 Canal WMA
 Cartwheel Bay Heritage Preserve/Wildlife Management Area
 Causey Tract, Gravely WMA, Clemson University
 Chestnut Ridge Heritage Preserve/Wildlife Management Area
 Cliff Pitts WMA
 Clinton Reservoir Tract
 Crackerneck Wildlife Management Area and Ecological Reserve
 Ditch Pond Heritage Preserve/Wildlife Management Area
 Donnelley Wildlife Management Area
 Draper Wildlife Management Area
 Dungannon Plantation Heritage Preserve/Wildlife Management Area
 Eastatoe Creek Heritage Preserve/Wildlife Management Area
 Edisto River Wildlife Management Area
 Eva Russell Chandler Heritage Preserve/Wildlife Management Area
 Fant's Grove WMA
 Forty Acre Rock Heritage Preserve/Wildlife Management Area
 Francis Marion National Forest
 Gray Court Tract Wildlife Management Area
 Great Pee Dee River Heritage Preserve/Wildlife Management Area
 Hamilton Ridge WMA
 Hatchery WMA
 Henderson Heritage Preserve/Wildlife Management Area
 Herbert Kirsh Wildlife Conservation Area
 Hickory Top WMA
 James L. Mason WMA
 James Ross Wildlife Reservation
 Jocassee Gorges
 Keowee WMA
 Landsford Canal Forest Legacy Area
 Laurel Fork Heritage Preserve/Wildlife Management Area
 Lewis Ocean Bay Heritage Preserve/Wildlife Management Area
 Liberty Hill WMA
 Little Pee Dee Heritage Preserve/Wildlife Management Area
 London Creek Wildlife Management Area
 Longleaf Pine Heritage Preserve/Wildlife Management Area
 Lynchburg Savanna Heritage Preserve/Wildlife Management Area
 Manchester State Forest
 Marsh Wildlife Management Area
 McBee WMA
 McCalla WMA
 McConnells Tract
 Moultrie Hunt Unit WMA
 Nine Times Preserve
 Oak Lea Wildlife Management Area
 Old Island Heritage Preserve/Wildlife Management Area
 Palachucola Wildlife Management Area
 Pee Dee Station Site WMA
 Rock Hill Blackjacks Heritage Preserve/Wildlife Management Area
 Samworth Wildlife Management Area
 Sandhills State Forest WMA
 Santee Coastal Reserve Wildlife Management Area
 Santee Cooper Tract WMA
 Santee Cooper Wildlife Management Area
 Santee Dam WMA
 Santee-Delta Wildlife Management Area
 South Fenwick Island
 St. Helena Sound Heritage Preserve/Wildlife Management Area
 Stevens Creek Heritage Preserve/Wildlife Management Area
 Stumphouse Mountain Heritage Preserve/Wildlife Management Area
 Sumter National Forest - Andrew Pickens Ranger District
 Sumter National Forest - Enoree Ranger District
 Sumter National Forest - Long Cane Ranger District
 Tall Pines WMA
 Thurmond Tract Wildlife Management Area
 Tillman Sand Ridge Heritage Preserve/Wildlife Management Area
 Tuomey Tract Dove Field, Manchester State Forest (MSF) WMA
 Turtle Island WMA
 Victoria Bluff Heritage Preserve/Wildlife Management Area
 Waccamaw River Heritage Preserve/Wildlife Management Area
 Wadakoe Mountain Heritage Preserve/Wildlife Management Area
 Wateree Heritage Preserve /Wildlife Management Area
 Watson-Cooper Heritage Preserve/Wildlife Management Area
 Webb Wildlife Center
 Wee Tee WMA
 Wild Turkey Management Demonstration Area
 Woodbury WMA
 Worth Mountain WMA

References

External links
 Wildlife Management Areas - South Carolina Department of Natural Resources

 
Wildlife management areas
Wildlife Management Areas
Wildlife management areas
South Carolina
South Carolina
Wildlife management areas
South Carolina